Count Binface is a satirical political candidate created by British comedian Jonathan Harvey in 2018. He was a candidate for Uxbridge and South Ruislip in the 2019 United Kingdom general election against prime minister Boris Johnson. He also stood in the 2021 London mayoral election.

In earlier elections Harvey stood as Lord Buckethead, but was forced to change the name due to a copyright dispute with American filmmaker Todd Durham, who created the character for his 1984 science fiction film Hyperspace.  Another individual contested the Uxbridge and South Ruislip seat as Buckethead, representing the Official Monster Raving Loony Party, to which Binface said he "look[s] forward to both the hustings and to challenging [him] to take part in a receptacle-to-receptacle debate".

Character

Count Binface is an independent space warrior in a black and grey costume, with a long silver cape and a helmet shaped somewhat like a dustbin with a glowing strip where his eyes would be. Binface claimed to be 5,965 years old in 2019.

2019 general election policies
Binface announced a series of satirical policies for the 2019 general election, including:
Bringing back Ceefax, the teletext service. He had previously promised to bring back the service in 2017 as Lord Buckethead.
Returning 20,001 police officers to the street, a reference to the Conservative pledge of 20,000 more police officers.
Nationalising model railways.
Holding a referendum on holding a second referendum on the United Kingdom's membership in the European Union.
Allowing any Czechs on the Irish Border to remain.
Nationalising Adele, the English singer.
Abolishing the House of Lords. He had previously pledged the same in 2017 as Lord Buckethead.
Giving free broadband to everyone,
Stopping the sale of arms to repressive regimes.
Making Piers Morgan zero emissions by 2030.
Renaming London Bridge to "Phoebe Waller-Bridge".
Introducing a minimum voting age of 16 and a maximum of 80.
Sending £1 trillion a week to the NHS,
Proroguing Jacob Rees-Mogg,
Banishing Katie Hopkins to the Phantom Zone.
Moving the hand dryer in the men's toilet at Uxbridge's Crown and Treaty pub to a "more sensible position".

London mayoral election 
Binface announced his intention to stand for the London Mayoral Election, which was originally scheduled for 2020, but was delayed until 2021 due to the COVID-19 pandemic. He announced a suite of  21 policies which "marries fiscal responsibility, social awareness, and not being an anti-vaccine nutjob", including:
Finish Crossrail,
Free parking for electric vehicles between Vine Street and the Strand, in reference to where the Free Parking space is located on the British Monopoly board,
London to join the European Union,
Renaming London Bridge to "Phoebe Waller-Bridge" and Hammersmith Bridge to "Wayne Bridge".
All government ministers' pay, including that of the mayors should be tied to that of nurses for the next 100 years.
Loud snacks to be banned from theatres. 
The use of the speakerphone function on mobile phones to be banned in public. Any offenders caught will be forced to watch the film version of Cats every day for a year. 
Binface started a fundraiser to raise £10,000, the amount necessary to allow him to stand for Mayor of London. The excess money was donated to charity Shelter to help combat homelessness.

He finished 9th with 24,775 votes in the mayoral election.

Electoral history

See also
Vermin Supreme, an American satirical candidate.

References

External links
Official website

Living people
Independent politicians in England
Independent British political candidates
British political satire
Year of birth missing (living people)
Fictional characters introduced in 2018
Fictional counts and countesses
Fictional extraterrestrial characters
British political party founders